Anis Mehmeti (born 9 January 2001) is a professional footballer who plays as an attacking midfielder for English  club Bristol City. Born in England, he represents Albania internationally.

Club career
Mehmeti played for Fulham and Tottenham Hotspur as a schoolboy, before joining Norwich City in 2017. In 2019, Mehmeti signed a contract extension with Norwich until 2020. In November 2019, Mehmeti joined Essex Senior League side Woodford Town, until March when the season was cancelled due to the COVID-19 pandemic.

On 29 September 2020, Mehmeti joined EFL Championship side Wycombe Wanderers following the introduction of a ‘B Team’ programme at the club. He made his professional debut on 17 October 2020, appearing as a 79th-minute substitute during a 2–1 loss to Millwall. He scored his first professional goal in a 1–1 draw against Queens Park Rangers on 19 December 2020. On 30 November 2021 he signed a new contract keeping him at Wycombe Wanderers until June 2024.

On 31 January 2023, Mehmeti signed for Championship club Bristol City on a three-and-a-half year deal. The fee, although undisclosed, was a club-record fee received for Wycombe.

International career
Mehmeti represented the Albania under-19 team.

On 25 May 2021, Mehmeti earned his first call-up to the Albania national under-21 football team for the 2023 UEFA European Under-21 Championship qualification match against Andorra under-21s on 4 June 2021 and a friendly match against Bulgaria under-21s on 8 June 2021, eventually making his debut and scoring his first goal in the first of those games.

In March 2023, he received his first call-up to the Albanian senior national team for the UEFA Euro 2024 qualifying match against Poland.

Career statistics

References

2001 births
Living people
Albanian footballers
Albania youth international footballers
English footballers
Footballers from the London Borough of Islington
English people of Albanian descent
Association football midfielders
Norwich City F.C. players
Woodford Town F.C. players
Wycombe Wanderers F.C. players
Bristol City F.C. players
Essex Senior Football League players
English Football League players
Kosovo Albanians
English people of Kosovan descent